Foss Glacier is within the Alpine Lakes Wilderness of Snoqualmie National Forest in the U.S. state of Washington and is on the northeast slope of Mount Hinman. Foss Glacier retreated almost  between 1950 and 2005. Foss Glacier is separated from the nearly vanished Hinman Glacier to the west by a ridge.

See also
List of glaciers in the United States

References

Glaciers of the North Cascades
Glaciers of King County, Washington
Glaciers of Washington (state)